For Italy (PI) was the name of two centrist and mainly Christian-democratic parliamentary groups active in each house of the Italian Parliament: the Chamber of Deputies and the Senate.

The groups were launched on 12 December 2013, following a split from Civic Choice (SC), whose parliamentary groups included also the Union of the Centre (UdC). The Christian-democratic faction of SC, led by Mario Mauro, Lorenzo Dellai, Andrea Olivero and Lucio Romano, left, along with the UdC, to form the For Italy groups. In July 2014 Mauro's party, the Populars for Italy (PpI), suffered the split of its left-wing, which formed Solidary Democracy (Demo.S), while remaining part of the joint parliamentary groups. In fact, both Dellai and Romano, chairmen of the groups, joined the new party.

The groups' composition was quite unstable as they experienced several splits. In October 2014 two deputies, who were once PpI members, left For Italy in order to join the Democratic Party (PD). In November, three deputies belonging to Democratic Centre (CD), joined the group in the Chamber, after having left the Mixed Group; the group was thus renamed "For Italy–Democratic Centre". Also in November the three PpI senators left For Italy in order to join Great Autonomies and Freedom, a centre-right miscellaneous group. In December the three senators of Demo.S, including the group's leader Romano, left in order to join For the Autonomies, a miscellaneous autonomist/centre-left group, while the four remaining senators of For Italy (including the two affiliated to the UdC) and the six deputies of the UdC left in order to join Popular Area, two newly formed groups led by the New Centre-Right. After these movements, the For Italy group in Chamber was left with 13 deputies (8 Demo.S, 3 CD and 2 PpI) and the one in the Senate was effectively disbanded. In August 2015 Carmelo Lo Monte left CD and PI in the Chamber, while the following September Maurizio Baradello joined Demo.S and PI. In January 2015 the group changed its name to Solidary Democracy – Democratic Centre.

Leadership
Group Leader in the Chamber of Deputies: Lorenzo Dellai (2013–2015)
Group Leader in the Senate: Lucio Romano (2013–2014)

References

Defunct political party alliances in Italy
Parliamentary groups in Italy